Robert Simpson (3 July 1923 – 8 April 1997) was a unionist politician in Northern Ireland.

Early life and education
Born in Ballymena and often known as Bob Simpson, Simpson studied medicine at Queen's University Belfast before setting up his own practice.

Political career
He joined the Ulster Unionist Party (UUP) in 1952, and was selected as the party's candidate for Mid Antrim. He won the seat, unopposed, at the 1953 Northern Ireland general election, and held it at each election thereafter, not facing a single opponent until 1969.

A strong support of Terence O'Neill's reforms, Simpson was appointed briefly as Additional Parliamentary Secretary in the Department of the Prime Minister, and then as the first Minister for Community Relations in late 1969.  He resigned from the freemasons and from the Orange Order in an attempt to appear impartial. In the role, he organised a series of dinner parties with attendees from both nationalist and unionist backgrounds, and through these developed a friendship with Seamus Heaney.

When Brian Faulkner became Prime Minister of Northern Ireland in 1971, Simpson was removed from his ministerial post and, the following year, Simpson resigned from the UUP. 

Simpson spent the remainder of his life writing on medicine, agriculture and travel, developing an arboretum and organising the Ballymena Music Festival.

References

1923 births
1997 deaths
Members of the House of Commons of Northern Ireland 1953–1958
Members of the House of Commons of Northern Ireland 1958–1962
Members of the House of Commons of Northern Ireland 1962–1965
Members of the House of Commons of Northern Ireland 1965–1969
Members of the House of Commons of Northern Ireland 1969–1973
Members of the Privy Council of Northern Ireland
Northern Ireland junior government ministers (Parliament of Northern Ireland)
General practitioners from Northern Ireland
Ulster Unionist Party members of the House of Commons of Northern Ireland
Alumni of Queen's University Belfast
People from Ballymena
Members of the House of Commons of Northern Ireland for County Antrim constituencies
Politicians from County Antrim